José Paulo Lanyi (born April 10, 1970) is a Brazilian journalist, writer and filmmaker.

He is the author of the novel "Calixto – Azar de quem votou em mim" ("Calixto- Bad luck for whom voted for me", in free translation/Amazon) and of the 'scenic novel' "Deus me disse que não existe" ("God told me that he doesn't exist", in free translation/Chiado Books, Portugal)- 'scenic novel' is considered by Lanyi as a new literary genre that combines both novel and play (theatre).

Published by the Official Press of the State of São Paulo, his play "Quando dorme o vilarejo" ("When the village sleeps", in free translation), recognized in 2002 by the Brazilian Vladimir Herzog Award for Amnesty and Human Rights coverage, tells the story of a hamlet whose residents become happy when learn that they will be hanged by the community in which they live. Inspired by the surreal movies by Luis Buñuel, the play was staged with the United Nations support at the São Bento Theatre in São Paulo, on December 10, 2008.

Lanyi graduated in journalism from Faculdade Cásper Líbero in 1993. He has worked as a reporter for some of the major São Paulo television and radio networks, among them Globo TV, Rede Bandeirantes, Manchete TV, CBN Radio, Globo Radio, Radiobrás and CNT TV. He also collaborated with the literary magazine "Cult" and was a foreign correspondent in London (UK) in 1995.

He was a columnist for Observatório da Imprensa and Comunique-se media criticism websites and worked in São Paulo as a BBC freelance reporter and as a director of making of and as an executive producer for the 2017 film "" ("Real, The Plan Behind History").

In 2020 he published on Amazon his history play "Maquiavel, O Homem por Trás do Mal" ("Machiavelli, The Man Behind Evil").

Lanyi is a member of the São Paulo Association of Art Critics (Associação Paulista de Críticos de Arte) – APCA.

Awards

Esso Journalism Award (2005) – given to allTV in recognition of their journalistic work. Lanyi was part of the news team, as host, producer, editor and reporter.

Vladimir Herzog Award (2002) – for his play "Quando dorme o vilarejo".

IBest Award  (2005/2006) given to Comunique-se web portal (where Lanyi worked as a columnist), for their journalistic activities.

List of works

 2020 -"Maquiavel, O Homem Por Trás do Mal" ("Machiavelli, The Man Behind Evil"; play).
 2012–2013/2018 – Crítica de Jornalismo (Criticism of journalism; collection of media critiscim, 5 volumes).
 2012 – O Artista Joseval e Quando Dorme o Vilarejo (The artist Joseval and When the village sleeps; play).
 2012 – Vida a três (Three-person relationship in free translation; screenplay).
 2012 – Balbúrdia Literária (Literary Shambles; chronic, poetry, short stories).
 2002 – Quando Dorme o Vilarejo (When the village sleeps; play).
 2002/2018 – Deus Me Disse que Não Existe (God told me that He doesn't exist; scenic novel).
 2000 – Calixto – Azar de quem votou em mim (Calixto- Bad luck for whom voted for me; novel).

Title
 Member of the São Paulo Association of Art Critics (APCA).

References

External links
"Deus me disse que não existe", Harvard Library
IMDB, Internet Movie Database
"Deus me disse que não existe", Cambridge University Library
"Deus me disse que não existe", Yale University Library
"Maquiavel, O Homem Por Trás do Mal" ("Machiavelli, The Man Behind Evil", Amazon)
"Deus me disse que não existe", University of Mannheim Library
"Book launch", in Arte Institute, New York/USA
"Deus me disse que não existe", University of Pisa Library
 BBC Brasil: As diferenças culturais na visão de um refugiado sírio no Brasil
"Deus me disse que não existe", University of Tokyo Library
Morgan Freeman's Through the Wormhole, Full Cast & Crew. See "Produced by"
"Deus me disse que não existe", WorldCat
 Folha de S. Paulo (Opinião, Tendências/Debates): "O apartheid econômico na ilha de Fidel"
"Deus me disse que não existe", published in Portugal
 BBC Brasil: 'Professor que pedia emprego em semáforos é contratado com ajuda das redes sociais'
 BBC Brasil: 'O professor universitário que pede emprego no semáforo'
 UOL Economia: 'O professor universitário que pede emprego no semáforo'
 BBC Brasil: 'Meu técnico é o caminhão': O lixeiro que já deixou muitos quenianos para trás na São Silvestre
 Folha de S. Paulo: 'Meu técnico é o caminhão': O lixeiro que já deixou muitos quenianos para trás na São Silvestre
 G1:  As diferenças culturais na visão de um refugiado sírio no Brasil
 'José Paulo Lanyi articles for Observatório da Imprensa'

Living people
Brazilian journalists
Male journalists
Brazilian columnists
Writers from São Paulo
21st-century Brazilian novelists
21st-century Brazilian dramatists and playwrights
Brazilian screenwriters
1970 births
Brazilian film directors
21st-century Brazilian male writers
Brazilian male novelists
21st-century screenwriters
Brazilian people of Hungarian descent